Sumak Helena Sirén Gualinga (born February 27, 2002) is an Ecuadorian environmental and human rights activist from the Kichwa Sarayaku community in Pastaza, Ecuador.

Early life 
Helena Gualinga was born on February 27, 2002, in the Indigenous Kichwa Sarayaku community located in Pastaza, Ecuador. Her mother, Noemí Gualinga is an Indigenous Ecuadorian former president of the Kichwa Women's Association. Her older sister is the activist Nina Gualinga. Her aunt Patricia Gualinga and her grandmother Cristina Gualinga are defenders of Indigenous women's human rights in the Amazon and environmental causes. Her father is Anders Sirén, a Swedish-speaking Finnish  professor of biology in the department of geography and geology at the University of Turku.

Gualinga was born in Sarayaku territory in Pastaza, Ecuador. She spent most of her teenage years living in Pargas and later in Turku, Finland where her father comes from. She attends secondary school at the Cathedral School of Åbo.

From a young age, Gualinga has witnessed the persecution of her family for standing against the interests of big oil companies and their environmental impact on Indigenous land. Several leaders members of her community have lost their life in violent conflicts against the government and corporations. She has stated for Yle that she sees her involuntary upbringing in such an agitated environment as an opportunity.

Activism 
Gualinga has become a spokesperson for the Sarayaku Indigenous community. Her activism includes exposing the conflict between her community and oil companies by carrying an empowering message among the youth in local schools in Ecuador. She also actively exposes this message to the international community hoping to reach policy-makers.

She and her family describe numerous ways in which they, as members of indigenous communities in the Amazon, have experienced climate change, including a higher prevalence of forest fires, desertification, direct destruction and disease spread by floods, and faster melting snow on mountain peaks. These effects, she says, have been noticeable firsthand in the lifetimes of community elders. Gualinga describes that those elders have become aware of climate change regardless of their lack of scientific background.

Gualinga held a sign that read "sangre indígena, ni una sola gota más" (Indigenous blood, not one more drop) outside of the UN headquarters in New York City at a demonstration with hundreds other of young environmental activists during the 2019 UN Climate Action Summit.

Helena Gualinga participated in the COP25 in Madrid, Spain. She spoke about her concern on the Ecuadorian government authorizing oil extraction in indigenous land. She said: "Our country's government is still granting our territories to the corporations responsible of climate change. This is criminal." She criticized the Ecuadorian government for claiming interest in protecting the Amazon during the conference instead of attending indigenous Amazon women's demands brought to the government during the 2019 Ecuadorian protests. She also expressed her disappointment towards world leaders' lack of interest to discuss topics brought by indigenous peoples to the conference.

Gualinga founded Polluters Out with Isabella Fallahi and Ayisha Siddiqa  which aimed at fossil fuel industries. The movement was founded as a response to the failing of COP25. The movement's petition is to: "Demand that Patricia Espinosa, Executive Secretary to the United Nations Framework Convention on Climate Change (UNFCCC), refuse funding from fossil fuel corporations For COP26!".

In popular media 
Helena Gualinga is the protagonist of the documentary "Helena Sarayaku Manta" (Helena of Sarayaku), which documents her life and activism related to teaching the Sarayaku ways of living. The film was directed by Eriberto Gualinga and premiered on March 18, 2022 at the Environmental Film Festival in the Nation's Capital.

On April 4, 2022 Helena Gualinga and her sister Nina Gualinga were featured in Revista Hogar magazine. Their photographs were on the cover of the 691st issue of the magazine and according to Helena's social media, it was the first time ever that indigenous women were on the magazine's cover.

On April 22, 2022 Helena Gualinga was pictured in Vogue magazine in an article on traditional Kichwa Sarayaku face paintings written by Atenea Morales de la Cruz.

References

External links 
 Polluters Out,

2002 births
Living people
Ecuadorian women activists
Ecuadorian people of Finnish descent
Expatriates in Finland
Women environmentalists
Ecuadorian environmentalists
People from Pastaza Province
21st-century Ecuadorian women
Ecuadorian people of Quechua descent
Indigenous activists of the Americas
Indigenous women of the Americas
Indigenous peoples and the environment
Youth climate activists